34th Battalion may refer to:

Military units
 34th Battalion (Australia),  1st Australian Imperial Force 
 34th Battalion (New Zealand)
 34th Battalion, CEF, Canadian Expeditionary Force
 34 Battalion (SWATF), South West Africa Territorial Force
 HDF 34th Bercsényi László Special Forces Battalion, Hungary
 34th Battalion Virginia Cavalry

Other uses

See also
 34th Brigade (disambiguation)
 34th Division (disambiguation)
 34th Regiment (disambiguation)